Just One More may refer to:

 Just One More (album), an album by Mad Caddies
 "Just One More" (song), a 1956 song by George Jones